The Alvis Firebird was a British touring car made between 1935 and 1939 by Alvis Ltd in Coventry.

Developed from the Alvis Firefly, 449 Firebirds were produced, as a two-door Tourer, a 2+2 sports tourer, a two-door drophead Coupé, and a four-door Saloon.

Powered by an 1842 cc 4-cylinder overhead-valve Alvis engine, it had an aluminium body on an ash wood frame. As with other Alvis cars, the Firebird was built as a rolling chassis then sent to the coachbuilders Cross & Ellis, to be finished to the customer's requirements, so all Alvis Firebirds are different. The Firebird had an all-synchromesh gearbox, and the chassis was lubricated by grease nipples under the bonnet.

In 1939 World War II halted Alvis car production to make aircraft engines, and a German Luftwaffe bomb destroyed the Alvis car factory in 1940.

References

External links

 Alvis cars Owners Club web site

Firebird
Cars introduced in 1935